Gelechia flexurella is a moth of the family Gelechiidae. It is found in North America, where it has been recorded from Pennsylvania.

The forewings are greyish fuscous, with a pale greyish band near the apex margined internally on the costa by a blackish-brown spot, with another of the same hue about the middle of the costa and another on the costa near the base. Near the base of the fold is a rather faint dark brownish spot, and the wing is sprinkled with dark brown atoms. The hindwings are dark fuscous.

References

Moths described in 1860
Gelechia